Peuplingues is a commune in the Pas-de-Calais department in the Hauts-de-France region of France.

Geography
Peuplingues is located 5 miles (8 km) southwest of Calais, at the junction of the D243 and D243E roads, about a mile from the A16 autoroute. The French portal of the Channel Tunnel is physically located in Peuplingues.

Population

Places of interest
 The church of Notre-Dame dating from the seventeenth century.

See also
Communes of the Pas-de-Calais department

References

Communes of Pas-de-Calais
Pale of Calais